Morrin (also Romanized as Morrīn; also known as Mūrīn and Mūyen) is a village in Hanza Rural District, Hanza District, Rabor County, Kerman Province, Iran. At the 2006 census, its population was 29, in 9 families.

References 

Populated places in Rabor County